Sorin Constantin Ispir (born 26 July 1988) is a Romanian footballer who plays as a midfielder. In his career, Ispir also played for teams such as Victoria Brănești, Concordia Chiajna, Academica Clinceni or Metaloglobus București, among others.

References

External links
 
 

People from Ilfov County
1988 births
Living people
Romanian footballers
Association football midfielders
Liga I players
Liga II players
Liga III players
CS Brănești players
CS Mioveni players
CS Concordia Chiajna players
LPS HD Clinceni players
FC Voluntari players
CS Afumați players
FC Metaloglobus București players